The graysby (Cephalopholis cruentata) is a species of marine ray-finned fish, a grouper from the subfamily Epinephelinae which is in the family Serranidae which also includes the anthias and sea basses. It is found in the western Atlantic. It is associated with reefs and is a quarry species for commercial and recreational fisheries.

Description 
The graysby has an oblong-shaped, robust body with a long snout and, when the mouth is closed, a slightly protruding upper jaw and a bony protuberance at the maxilla. The dorsal profile of the head is flat or slightly convex between its eyes. The majority of the teeth are movable. The dorsal fin contains 9 spines and 13-15 soft rays while the anal fin has 3 spines and 8 soft rays. The rounded peropercule has fine serrations on its margin but has no spines or notches, the operculum or gill cover has 3 flat spines, the central spine being the largest and upper spine is longer than the lowest. The caudal fin is rounded while the pelvic fins are shorter than the pectoral fins. The body is covered in rough scales and there are 69-81 scales in the lateral line. The head, body, and fins are grey, brown or olive in colour and are covered with orange-brown spots and there are normally four spots along their upper back, underneath the dorsal fin which can change colour between black and white. A white stripe runs from the tip of the lower jaw, between the eyes and on to the nape.

Distribution
The Graysby is found in the western Atlantic Ocean, the Caribbean Sea and the Gulf of Mexico. It is found from Cape Fear, North Carolina and Bermuda south to the Caribbean coast of South America. Claims of this species being recorded from Brazil require confirmation.

Habitat and biology

The graysby inhabits Thalassia beds and coral reefs. A solitary and secretive species, they usually stay near hiding places during the day. The graysby is a nocturnal predator, adults feed mainly on fishes, with preference on Chromis multilineata, juveniles feed on shrimps. These fishes are protogynous hermaphrodites they all start life as female to male becoming males in their middle age. The change in sex occurs straight after the spawning period in August and September. The males vigorously guard a harem which have an average of one male to six female. When spawning, a female will releases between 260 and 600 eggs and the male then releases his milt to fertilise them. They can live for up to 13 years.

It is parasitized by Pseudorhabdosynochus meganmarieae.

Taxonomy
The graysby was first formally described in 1802 as Sparus cruentatus by the French naturalist Bernard Germain de Lacépède (1756-1825) with the type locality given as the Antilles and Bahamas.

Utilisation
The graysby is a quarry species for both commercial fisheries and for anglers.  It makes up 11% of the commercial reef-fish catch in Curacao and it was taken by line, trap and spear fisheries in Honduras in the past but constitutes only a small part of the total reef-fish catch in Honduras. It is common around Cuba where it is not an important quarry species for fisheries. In the United States the fisheries for this species fall under the South Atlantic Fishery Management Council and both commercial and recreational fisheries have a close season which runs from 1 January to 30 April.

References

External links
 

Graysby
Fauna of the Southeastern United States
Fish of the Caribbean
Fish of Cuba
Fish of the Dominican Republic
Fish described in 1802